Nelson Mandela Academic Hospital is a large Provincial government funded hospital situated in central Mthatha in South Africa. It is a tertiary teaching hospital and forms part of the Mthatha Hospital Complex.

The hospital departments include Emergency department, Paediatric ward, Maternity ward, Obstetrics/Gynecology, Out Patients Department, Surgical Services, Medical Services, Operating Theatre & CSSD Services, Pharmacy, Anti-Retroviral (ARV) treatment for HIV/AIDS, Post Trauma Counseling Services, Ophthalmology Out-patients Clinic, Occupational Services, X-ray Services, Physiotherapy, NHLS Laboratory, Oral Health Care Provides, Laundry Services, Kitchen Services and Mortuary.

References
Nelson Mandela Academic Hospital

Teaching hospitals in South Africa
Medical education in South Africa
Walter Sisulu University
King Sabata Dalindyebo Local Municipality